Helcystogramma is a genus of moths in the family Gelechiidae. The genus was erected by Philipp Christoph Zeller in 1877.

Distribution and diversity
The genus is distributed almost worldwide, with around half of known taxa occurring in Asia. In 1997 there were about 93 valid species, and more have since been described.

Species

Helcystogramma abortiva (Walsingham, 1911)
Helcystogramma adaequata Meyrick, 1914
Helcystogramma albilepidotum Li & Zhen, 2011
Helcystogramma albinervis (Gerasimov, 1929)
Helcystogramma amethystium (Meyrick, 1906)
Helcystogramma angustum Li & Zhen, 2011
Helcystogramma anthistis (Meyrick, 1929)
Helcystogramma archigrapha (Meyrick, 1929)
Helcystogramma armatum (Meyrick, 1911)
Helcystogramma arotraeum (Meyrick, 1894)
Helcystogramma arulensis (Rebel, 1929)
Helcystogramma aruritis (Meyrick, 1911)
Helcystogramma augusta (Meyrick, 1911)
Helcystogramma badia (Braun, 1921)
Helcystogramma balteatum (Meyrick, 1911)
Helcystogramma bicuneum (Meyrick, 1911)
Helcystogramma brabylitis (Meyrick, 1911)
Helcystogramma brevinodium Li & Zhen, 2011
Helcystogramma carycastis Meyrick, 1922
Helcystogramma casca (Braun, 1925)
Helcystogramma cerinura (Meyrick, 1923)
Helcystogramma chalybea (Felder & Rogenhofer, 1875)
Helcystogramma chalyburga Meyrick, 1922
Helcystogramma chambersella (Murtfeldt, 1874)
Helcystogramma claripunctella Ponomarenko, 1998
Helcystogramma clarkei Rose and Pathania, 2003
Helcystogramma compositaepictum (N. Omelko & M. Omelko, 1993)
Helcystogramma conturbata (Meyrick, 1933)
Helcystogramma convolvuli (Walsingham, 1908) – sweet potato leafroller
Helcystogramma cornuta (Busck, 1914)
Helcystogramma craticula (Meyrick, 1921)
Helcystogramma cricopa (Meyrick, 1911)
Helcystogramma crypsinomum (Meyrick, 1929)
Helcystogramma cyanozona (Meyrick, 1923)
Helcystogramma daedalea (Walsingham, 1911)
Helcystogramma delocosma (Meyrick, 1936)
Helcystogramma deltophora (Janse, 1954)
Helcystogramma ectopon Hodges, 1986
Helcystogramma engraptum (Meyrick, 1918)
Helcystogramma epicentra (Meyrick, 1911)
Helcystogramma fernaldella (Busck, 1903)
Helcystogramma fiscinata (Meyrick, 1918)
Helcystogramma flavescens Junnilainen, 2010
Helcystogramma flavifuscum Li & Zhen, 2011
Helcystogramma flavilineolella Ponomarenko, 1998
Helcystogramma flavistictum Li & Zhen, 2011
Helcystogramma furvimaculare Li & Zhen, 2011
Helcystogramma fuscomarginatum Ueda, 1995
Helcystogramma gradatum (Meyrick, 1910)
Helcystogramma graphicodes (Meyrick, 1914)
Helcystogramma gypsaspis Meyrick, 1921
Helcystogramma hapalyntis (Meyrick, 1911)
Helcystogramma hassenzanensis Park & Hodges, 1995
Helcystogramma helicopis (Meyrick, 1922)
Helcystogramma hemiopa (Meyrick, 1921)
Helcystogramma heterostigma (Diakonoff, 1967)
Helcystogramma heterotoma (Diakonoff, 1967)
Helcystogramma hibisci (Stainton, 1859)
Helcystogramma hoplophorum Meyrick, 1916
Helcystogramma hystricella (Braun, 1921)
Helcystogramma idiastis (Meyrick, 1916)
Helcystogramma imagibicuneum Li & Zhen, 2011
Helcystogramma imagitrijunctum Li & Zhen, 2011
Helcystogramma immeritellum (Walker, 1864)
Helcystogramma ineruditum (Meyrick, 1926)
Helcystogramma infibulatum Meyrick, 1916
Helcystogramma juventellus (Walsingham, 1897)
Helcystogramma klimeschi Ponomarenko & Huemer, 2001
Helcystogramma leucoplectum (Meyrick, 1911)
Helcystogramma lineolella (Zeller, 1839)
Helcystogramma lithostrotum Meyrick, 1916
Helcystogramma lochistis (Meyrick, 1911)
Helcystogramma luminosa (Busck, 1914)
Helcystogramma lutatella (Herrich-Schäffer, 1854)
Helcystogramma lyrella (Walsingham, 1911)
Helcystogramma malacogramma (Meyrick, 1909)
Helcystogramma meconitis (Meyrick, 1913)
Helcystogramma melanocarpa (Meyrick, 1929)
Helcystogramma melantherella (Busck, 1900)
Helcystogramma melissia (Walsingham, 1911)
Helcystogramma microsema (Meyrick, 1911)
Helcystogramma musicopa (Meyrick, 1908)
Helcystogramma nesidias (Meyrick, 1911)
Helcystogramma neurograpta (Meyrick, 1921)
Helcystogramma obscuratum (Meyrick, 1911)
Helcystogramma octophora (Meyrick, 1918)
Helcystogramma pantheropa (Meyrick, 1913)
Helcystogramma perceptella (Busck, 1914)
Helcystogramma perelegans (N. Omelko & M. Omelko, 1993)
Helcystogramma philomusum (Meyrick, 1918)
Helcystogramma phryganitis (Meyrick, 1911)
Helcystogramma rectangulum Li & Zhen, 2011
Helcystogramma rhabduchum (Meyrick, 1911)
Helcystogramma ribbeella (Zeller, 1877)
Helcystogramma rufescens (Haworth, 1828)
Helcystogramma rusticella (Walker, 1864)
Helcystogramma scintillula (Walsingham, 1911)
Helcystogramma selectella (Walker, 1864)
Helcystogramma septella (Zeller, 1852)
Helcystogramma sertigera Meyrick, 1923
Helcystogramma simplex (Walsingham, 1900)
Helcystogramma spilopis (Meyrick, 1927)
Helcystogramma stellatella (Busck, 1914)
Helcystogramma subvectella (Walker, 1864)
Helcystogramma symbolica Meyrick, 1914
Helcystogramma tegulella (Walsingham, 1897)
Helcystogramma thesmiopa (Meyrick, 1922)
Helcystogramma thiostoma (Meyrick, 1929)
Helcystogramma triannulella (Herrich-Schäffer, 1854)
Helcystogramma trichocyma (Meyrick, 1923)
Helcystogramma trigonella (Walsingham, 1892)
Helcystogramma trijunctum (Meyrick, 1934)
Helcystogramma tristellum (Snellen, 1901)
Helcystogramma uedai Rose and Pathania, 2003
Helcystogramma verberata (Meyrick, 1911)
Helcystogramma victrix (Meyrick, 1911)
Helcystogramma virescens (Walsingham, 1911)
Helcystogramma xerastis (Meyrick, 1905)

Former species
Helcystogramma ceriochrantum (Meyrick, 1939)
Helcystogramma obseratella (Zeller, 1877)

References

 
Dichomeridinae
Moth genera